Tomáš Jurčo (born 28 December 1992) is a Slovak professional ice hockey right winger who is currently playing for Kunlun Red Star of the Kontinental Hockey League (KHL). He began playing hockey in the HC Košice before moving to North America in 2009 to play for the Saint John Sea Dogs of the Quebec Major Junior Hockey League (QMJHL). He spent three seasons with Saint John, helping them win the Memorial Cup as major junior champions of Canada in 2011. Jurčo was drafted in the second round, 35th overall, by the Detroit Red Wings in the 2011 NHL Entry Draft.

Playing career

Junior
At the 2009 CHL Import Draft, Jurčo was selected fourth overall by the Saint John Sea Dogs of the Quebec Major Junior Hockey League (QMJHL). He joined the team that year and was nominated for the 2009–10 QMJHL Rookie of the Year award. His skill set involves a unique set of hands and a good sense of vision on the ice, and he was compared to his favourite player and fellow countryman, Marián Hossa. Jurčo's videos demonstrating his skills are popular among hockey fans on YouTube. Jurčo was a key contributor in the Sea Dogs' Memorial Cup championship title in 2011, where Saint John defeated the Mississauga St. Michael's Majors 3–1 in the Final.

On 25 June 2011, the Detroit Red Wings drafted Jurčo in the second round, 35th overall, as the team's first pick in the 2011 NHL Entry Draft.

Professional
On 7 August 2012, Jurčo signed a three-year, entry-level contract with the Red Wings. He was then assigned to the team's American Hockey League (AHL) affiliate, the Grand Rapids Griffins, for the 2012–13 season. He recorded 14 goals and 14 assists in 74 games in his first professional season. Jurčo was among the team's leading scorers during the 2013 Calder Cup playoffs, recording eight goals and six assists to help lead the Griffins to the Calder Cup championship over the Syracuse Crunch.

Jurčo began the 2013–14 season with the Griffins before being called up to the Detroit Red Wings. At the time of his first call-up, Jurčo led the Griffins in goals (11), assists (16), points (27) and power play goals (5). On 15 December 2013, Jurčo made his NHL debut for the Red Wings in a game against the Tampa Bay Lightning. Two nights later, on 17 December, he scored his first career NHL goal against Jonas Hiller of the Anaheim Ducks.

On 24 July 2015, Jurčo signed a two-year contract extension with the Red Wings. On 17 November 2015, Jurčo was assigned to the Grand Rapids Griffins on a conditioning assignment. Before being assigned to Grand Rapids, Jurčo appeared in four games for the Red Wings that season, recording one assist. On 20 November, Jurčo tied a franchise record with three power play goals, becoming just the third Griffin to accomplish the feat. Jurčo was named the CCM/AHL Player of the Week for the week ending 22 November. He posted a league-best seven points for the week, three goals, and four assists, and helped lead the Griffins to three consecutive wins, tallying assists on all three game-winning goals. On 28 November, Jurčo was recalled by the Red Wings from his conditioning assignment. In five games for the Griffins, Jurčo recorded five goals and four assists and helped lead the Griffins in winning all five games he appeared in.

On 24 February 2017, Jurčo was traded to the Chicago Blackhawks in exchange for a third-round pick in the 2017 draft. During his career with the Red Wings, he recorded 15 goals and 24 assists in 159 games. He closed out the regular season with the Blackhawks in scoring just 1 goal in 13 games and was a healthy scratch through Chicago's first-round defeat to the Nashville Predators. As a restricted free agent, on 26 June 2017, Jurčo was re-signed to a one-year contract extension with the Blackhawks.

At the conclusion of his contract with the Blackhawks, Jurčo remained a free agent over the summer and into the 2018–19 season. At the mid-point of the season, Jurčo belatedly signed a one-year AHL contract with the Springfield Thunderbirds, affiliate to the Florida Panthers on 3 January 2019. Jurčo posted 10 points in 14 games with the Thunderbirds before he was dealt to the Charlotte Checkers in exchange for future considerations, correlating in the Florida Panthers acquisition of Cliff Pu, on 25 February 2019. Jurčo made an immediate impact with the league-leading Checkers, contributing with 17 points in 19 regular season games. He helped Charlotte capture the Calder Cup with 18 points in 18 games, marking his second AHL championship.

On 1 July 2019, Jurčo was signed by former Red Wings general manager Ken Holland as a free agent with the Edmonton Oilers on a one-year $750,000 contract. He began the 2019–20 season, on the Oilers opening night roster, registering two assists through 12 games before he was re-assigned to AHL affiliate, the Bakersfield Condors. Suffering an injury, Jurčo was limited to just eight games with the Condors before the remainder of the season was cancelled due to the COVID-19 pandemic.

As a free agent from the Oilers, Jurčo signed a one-year, $700,000 contract with the Vegas Golden Knights on 10 October 2020.

On 3 November 2021, Jurčo belatedly signed a one-year contract with Barys Nur-Sultan of the Kontinental Hockey League (KHL). In his lone season with Barys in 2021–22, Jurčo was immediately inserted into the line-up and registered 11 points through 17 regular season games.

Leading into the following 2022–23 season, Jurčo again remained un-signed until opting to continue in the KHL by joining Chinese club, Kunlun Red Star on 24 November 2022.

International play

Jurčo represented Slovakia at the 2011 World Junior Ice Hockey Championships, scoring one point in six games. He again represented Slovakia at the 2012 World Junior Ice Hockey Championships, where he was the leading scorer on the team, recording one goal and seven assists in five games.

Jurčo was selected to play for the senior Slovakia team at the 2014 Winter Olympics in Sochi, where he finished the tournament with one goal in four games.

Jurčo represented Slovakia at the 2015 IIHF World Championship, where he recorded one assist in five games. Jurčo represented Slovakia at the 2016 IIHF World Championship, where he recorded two goals and three assists in seven games.

Personal life
Jurčo is the younger brother of Petra Jurčová, a veteran of the Slovak women's ice hockey team.

Career statistics

Regular season and playoffs

International

Awards and honours

References

External links
 
 
 
 

1992 births
Living people
Bakersfield Condors players
Barys Nur-Sultan players
Charlotte Checkers (2010–) players
Chicago Blackhawks players
Detroit Red Wings draft picks
Detroit Red Wings players
Edmonton Oilers players
Grand Rapids Griffins players
Henderson Silver Knights players
HC Košice players
HC Kunlun Red Star players
Ice hockey players at the 2014 Winter Olympics
Ice hockey players at the 2022 Winter Olympics
Olympic ice hockey players of Slovakia
Medalists at the 2022 Winter Olympics
Olympic bronze medalists for Slovakia
Olympic medalists in ice hockey
Rockford IceHogs (AHL) players
Saint John Sea Dogs players
Slovak expatriate ice hockey players in the United States
Slovak ice hockey right wingers
Sportspeople from Košice
Springfield Thunderbirds players
Vegas Golden Knights players
Slovak expatriate ice hockey players in Canada
Slovak expatriate sportspeople in China
Slovak expatriate sportspeople in Kazakhstan
Expatriate ice hockey players in Kazakhstan
Expatriate ice hockey players in China